A stone ball is a spherical man-made stone object.

Stone ball or stone sphere may also refer to:

Natural
Spherulite, a small, rounded body occurring in vitreous igneous rocks
Cannonball concretion, a natural cementation found in North Dakota
Cave pearl, concentric layers of calcium salts found in limestone caves
Products of spheroidal weathering

Artificial
Stone spheres of Costa Rica, artefacts of unknown purpose from the Diquís culture
Carved stone balls, artefacts of unknown purpose from prehistoric Scotland
 Various projectiles:
 Round shot, a type of cannonball
 Bolases, a throwing weapon

See also
 Petrosphere (disambiguation)